The Taedong River is a large river in North Korea.  The river rises in the Rangrim Mountains of the country's north where it then flows southwest into Korea Bay at Namp'o. In between, it runs through the country's capital, Pyongyang. Along the river are landmarks such as the Juche Tower and Kim Il-sung Square.

The river is 439 km or 272.7 mi in length, and is generally deep. It is the fifth-longest river on the Korean peninsula and the second-longest in North Korea. Pyongyang is approximately 110 km upstream from the mouth, Sunchon 192 km upstream, and Taehŭng 414 km upstream. Because of its depth, it is widely used for river transport; it is navigable by large ships up to 65 km inland, although most commercial traffic stops at Songrim.

History
The kingdom of Koguryo was founded on its shores. Many archeological sites dating to the neolithic and Bronze Ages have been found along the river, as well as relics and ruins from Koguryo. It was also once known as the Pae River. 

The Taedong River basin is believed to be the location of the Taedonggang Culture, the historical centre of the Korean nation, when its ancient civilization flourished in 3000 BC.

Dams and bridges
In 1986, the government completed the 8-km-long West Sea Barrage, with three locks and 36 sluices, at the mouth of the Taedong River near Namp'o. The dam acts to control floodwater and to irrigate lands newly reclaimed from the Korea Gulf. The dam prevents mixing of the outgoing river water with seawater, leading to an increase of contaminants concentration. Other dams, such as the Nyongwon Power Station, have been built to provide energy to the country.

In Pyongyang, there are six bridges on the Taedong, including the Okryu Bridge, Rungra Bridge, and Taedong Bridge.

Gallery

Notes

References

Citations

Bibliography
 .

See also

Taedong River estuary Important Bird Area
Taedonggang, a beer named after the river
Rivers of Asia
Rivers of Korea
Geography of North Korea

Rivers of North Korea
Geography of Pyongyang
South Pyongan